Domain masking or URL masking is the act of hiding the actual domain name of a website from the URL field of a user's web browser in favor of another name. There are many ways to do this, including the following examples.
 HTML inline frame or frameset so a frame embedded in the main website actually points to some other site.
 URL rewriting (e.g., mod_rewrite) or aliases to have the web server serve the same page for two different domain names.

Once the URL is masked it displays the URL mask rather than the original URL/domain name. Masking does not affect the content of the actual website; it only covers up the original URL/domain name. Domain masking prevents users from being able to see the actual domain website, whether it be due to length or privacy/security issues.

See also
Website spoofing
URL shortening
URL redirection

References 

Web design